The French cruiser Duquesne was an unprotected cruiser built for the French Navy. It was the sixth ship in the French Navy to be named for Abraham Duquesne. The ship was laid down at Arsenal de Rochefort in 1873 and launched in 1876. It was struck in 1901.

References

Ships built in France
1876 ships
Cruisers of the French Navy
Steamships of France